George Frederick Barber (1 August 1908 – 7 July 1974) was an English footballer who played as a full-back.

Club career
Barber played as a defender for Chelsea, amassing 263 league appearances. After more than fifty wartime appearances for Chelsea, Barber survived World War II, and died in 1974.

References

1908 births
1974 deaths
Footballers from West Ham
Footballers from Greater London
English footballers
Association football defenders
Luton Town F.C. players
Chelsea F.C. players